In mathematics, the Pompeiu problem is a conjecture in integral geometry, named for Dimitrie Pompeiu, who posed the problem in 1929, 
as follows.  Suppose f is a nonzero continuous function defined on a Euclidean space, and  K is a simply connected Lipschitz domain, so that the integral of f vanishes on every congruent copy of K.  Then the domain is a ball.

A special case is Schiffer's conjecture.

References

External links
 Pompeiu problem at Department of Geometry, Bolyai Institute, University of Szeged, Hungary
 Pompeiu problem at SpringerLink encyclopaedia of mathematics
     The Pompeiu problem,
     Schiffer's conjecture,

Mathematical analysis
Integral geometry
Conjectures
Unsolved problems in geometry